Daniel Ashley Martin (born 24 September 1986) is a former professional footballer. Martin made over 75 appearances in the Football League between 2005 and 2008, and played for England and Wales at youth level.

Career
Martin began his career as a trainee with Derby County in July 2002, having graduated from Derby's academy and captained Derby's Under-18 team to the quarter-finals of FA Youth Cup. He joined Notts County on a free transfer in July 2005, where he made 51 appearances, scoring eight goals, in two seasons. Martin was one of six players released by manager Steve Thompson at the end of the 2006–07 season, after which he signed for fellow League Two side Mansfield Town in June 2007. Martin was released by Mansfield at the end of the 2007–08 season after the club were relegated to the Football Conference, and joined Tamworth in June 2008 but left the club shortly afterwards. Martin then signed for Northern Counties East Football League Premier Division side Mickleover Sports and helped them do back-to-back promotions into the Northern Premier League Premier Division. He spent three seasons at Mickleover Sports before joining newly promoted Northern Premier League Division One South side Coalville Town in January 2012.

After joining Rocester as a player in 2015, Martin was appointed interim manager in 2016, before becoming the club's permanent manager. He left the club at the end of the 2017–18 season. In May 2018 Martin was appointed manager of Heanor Town. However, he resigned from the post in September that year.

References

External links

1986 births
Living people
Footballers from Derby
English footballers
Wales under-21 international footballers
Association football defenders
Derby County F.C. players
Notts County F.C. players
Mansfield Town F.C. players
Tamworth F.C. players
Mickleover Sports F.C. players
Coalville Town F.C. players
Mickleover Royals F.C. players
Rocester F.C. players
English Football League players
Northern Premier League players
Northern Counties East Football League players
English football managers
Rocester F.C. managers
Heanor Town F.C. managers